Betty Brook may refer to: 

 Betty Brook (Bear Kill tributary), in New York 
 Betty Brook (West Branch Delaware River), in New York